Frank LeRond McVey (November 10, 1869 – January 4, 1953) was an American economist, educator and academic administrator. He served as the fourth president of the University of North Dakota from 1909 to 1917 and the third president of the University of Kentucky from 1917 to 1940.

Early life and education 

McVey was born in Wilmington, Ohio in 1869. He received his B.A. from Ohio Wesleyan University and his Ph.D. in Economics from Yale University in 1895.

Career 
McVey taught at Horace Mann School in New York City, Teachers College at Columbia University, and the University of Minnesota, where he rose from instructor to tenured professor in his 11 years at the university's Department of Economics. In 1907, he was appointed chairman of the Minnesota Tax Commission by Governor John Albert Johnson.

President of the University of North Dakota 
At the age of 39, McVey became the youngest President of the University of North Dakota in 1909. McVey Hall, a residence hall at UND, was later named in his honor.

President of the University of Kentucky 
In 1917, McVey became the President of the University of Kentucky. During his tenure, several important campus buildings were constructed, including the university's Memorial Hall, the Margaret I. King Library, the Alumni Gymnasium, and an academic building that now bears his name, McVey Hall.

In 1923 he married the Dean of Women, Frances Jewell McVey (December 23, 1889 - June 13, 1945).

McVey retired in 1940 and continued to live in Lexington until his death in 1953.

References

Presidents of the University of Kentucky
1869 births
1953 deaths
Wesleyan University alumni
Yale University alumni
People from Wilmington, Ohio
Presidents of the University of North Dakota
University of Minnesota faculty